Aircar and similar may refer to:
 Compressed air car
 Flying car (aircraft)
 Klein Vision AirCar, a prototype of flying car
 AirCars, a shooter video game developed by MidNite Entertainment Group